The 1975 Ole Miss Rebels football team represented the University of Mississippi (Ole Miss) in the 1975 NCAA Division I football season. The Rebels were led by second-year head coach Ken Cooper and played their home games at Hemingway Stadium in Oxford, Mississippi and Mississippi Veterans Memorial Stadium in Jackson. The team competed as members of the Southeastern Conference, finishing in a three-way tie for second place with a conference record of 5–1. This was a significant improvement over the previous year, as the team went winless in conference in 1974.

Schedule

References

External links
 1975 highlights

Ole Miss
Ole Miss Rebels football seasons
Ole Miss Rebels football